The 2016 Women's Africa Cup of Nations was the 12th edition of the biennial international football championship organised by the Confederation of African Football (CAF) for the women's national teams of Africa. The tournament was held in Cameroon between 19 November and 3 December 2016. The initial dates were 8–22 October 2016, but were changed due to weather considerations. A total of eight teams played in the tournament.

On 6 August 2015, the CAF Executive Committee decided to change the name of the tournament from the African Women's Championship to the Women's Africa Cup of Nations, similar to the men's version, Africa Cup of Nations.

Qualification

Cameroon qualified automatically as hosts, while the remaining seven spots were determined by the qualifying rounds, which took place from March to April 2016.

Qualified teams
The following eight teams qualified for the final tournament. Mali replaced Equatorial Guinea after they were disqualified for fielding an ineligible player.

Venues
The tournament was held in Yaoundé and Limbe.

Squads

Each squad can contain a maximum of 21 players.

Draw
The draw for the final tournament of the competition took place on 18 September 2016, 16:00 UTC+1, at the Palais Polyvalent des Sports in Yaoundé. The eight teams were drawn into two groups of four. For the draw, the hosts Cameroon were seeded in position A1 and the defending champions Nigeria were seeded in position B1. The remaining six teams were seeded based on their results in the three most recent final tournaments.

Group stage
The top two teams of each group advance to the semi-finals.

Tiebreakers
The teams are ranked according to points (3 points for a win, 1 point for a draw, 0 points for a loss). If tied on points, tiebreakers are applied in the following order:
Number of points obtained in games between the teams concerned;
Goal difference in games between the teams concerned;
Goals scored in games between the teams concerned;
If, after applying criteria 1 to 3 to several teams, two teams still have an equal ranking, criteria 1 to 3 are reapplied exclusively to the matches between the two teams in question to determine their final rankings. If this procedure does not lead to a decision, criteria 5 to 7 apply;
Goal difference in all games;
Goals scored in all games;
Drawing of lots.

All times are local, WAT (UTC+1).

Group A

Group B

Knockout stage
In the knockout stage, if a match is level at the end of normal playing time, extra time is played (two periods of 15 minutes each) and followed, if necessary, by kicks from the penalty mark to determine the winner, except for the third place match where no extra time is played.

Bracket

Semi-finals

Third place play-off

Final

Goalscorers
6 goals

 Asisat Oshoala

3 goals

 Elizabeth Addo
 Desire Oparanozie

2 goals

 Henriette Akaba
 Linda Eshun
 Samira Suleman
 Bassira Touré

1 goal

 Raissa Feudjio
 Christine Manie
 Genevieve Ngo
 Gabrielle Onguéné
 Salma Tarik
 Portia Boakye
 Esse Akida
 Cheris Salano
 Sebe Coulibaly
 Binta Diarra
 Faith Ikidi
 Ngozi Okobi
 Francisca Ordega
 Uchechi Sunday
 Refiloe Jane
 Andisiwe Mgcoyi
 Linda Motlhalo
 Jermaine Seoposenwe
 Nothando Vilakazi

Awards
The following awards were given at the conclusion of the tournament:

Gallery

References

External links

Women’s Africa Cup Of Nations, Cameroon 2016, CAFonline.com

 
2016
Women Cup of Nations
2016 in women's association football
2016 in Cameroonian football
International association football competitions hosted by Cameroon
November 2016 sports events in Africa
December 2016 sports events in Africa